The 1984 Furman Paladins football team was an American football team that represented Furman University as a member of the Southern Conference (SoCon) during the 1984 NCAA Division I-AA football season. In their seventh year under head coach Dick Sheridan, the Paladins compiled an overall record of 8–3 with a conference mark of 3–3, placing fourth in the SoCon.

Schedule

References

Furman
Furman Paladins football seasons
Furman Paladins football